One third of Mole Valley District Council in Surrey, England is elected each year, followed by one year when there is an election to Surrey County Council instead.

Political control
Since the first election to the council in 1973 political control of the council has been held by the following parties:

Leadership
The leaders of the council since 2012 have been:

Council elections
1973 Mole Valley District Council election
1976 Mole Valley District Council election (New ward boundaries)
1979 Mole Valley District Council election
1980 Mole Valley District Council election
1982 Mole Valley District Council election
1983 Mole Valley District Council election
1984 Mole Valley District Council election
1986 Mole Valley District Council election (District boundary changes took place but the number of seats remained the same)
1987 Mole Valley District Council election
1988 Mole Valley District Council election
1990 Mole Valley District Council election
1991 Mole Valley District Council election
1992 Mole Valley District Council election
1994 Mole Valley District Council election (District boundary changes took place but the number of seats remained the same)
1995 Mole Valley District Council election (District boundary changes took place but the number of seats remained the same)
1996 Mole Valley District Council election
1998 Mole Valley District Council election
1999 Mole Valley District Council election
2000 Mole Valley District Council election (New ward boundaries)
2002 Mole Valley District Council election
2003 Mole Valley District Council election
2004 Mole Valley District Council election
2006 Mole Valley District Council election
2007 Mole Valley District Council election
2008 Mole Valley District Council election
2010 Mole Valley District Council election
2011 Mole Valley District Council election
2012 Mole Valley District Council election
2014 Mole Valley District Council election
2015 Mole Valley District Council election
2016 Mole Valley District Council election
2018 Mole Valley District Council election
2019 Mole Valley District Council election
2021 Mole Valley District Council election
2022 Mole Valley District Council election

By-election results

1994-1998

2002-2006

2010-2014

2014-2018

2022-2026

References

By-election results

External links
Mole Valley District Council

 
Mole Valley
Council elections in Surrey
District council elections in England